Joshué Quiñónez (born 29 May 2001) is an Ecuadorian professional footballer who plays as a defender for Barcelona SC.

Club career
In December 2021, Barcelona SC extended his contract.

In March 2022, FC Dallas acquired Quiñónez on loan. Quiñónez made his FC Dallas debut on 19 April 2022 against FC Tulsa.

International career
In October 2021, Quiñónez made his international debut for the Ecuador national team.

References

External links

2001 births
Living people
Ecuadorian footballers
Ecuador international footballers
Association football defenders
Barcelona S.C. footballers
FC Dallas players
Major League Soccer players
Sportspeople from Guayaquil
Ecuadorian expatriate footballers
Ecuadorian expatriate sportspeople in the United States